Galka may refer to:
 Galka, Perm Krai, a settlement in Russia
 Galka, Volgograd Oblast, a settlement in Russia
 Konrad Gałka (born 1974), a Polish swimmer
 Galka, a race of warriors in Final Fantasy XI